Hate Crime is a 2013 American found footage horror film directed by James Cullen Bressack, co-written by Bressack and Jarret Cohen.

Plot
A group of crystal meth-crazed neo-Nazis invade a Jewish family's home and subject them to beating, rape, torture, incest and murder.

Cast

Release
In March 2015 the British Board of Film Classification (BBFC) refused to issue a certificate to the film for a video-on-demand release, stating:

It is the Board's carefully considered conclusion that the unremitting manner in which [the film] focuses on physical and sexual abuse, aggravated by racist invective, means that to issue a classification to this work, even if confined to adults, would be inconsistent with the Board's Guidelines, would risk potential harm, and would be unacceptable to broad public opinion.

James Cullen Bressack commented that he was "honoured to know that [his] mind is officially too twisted for the UK." Though some reacted positively to the ban, which was the BBFC's first (and as of 2018 only) complete refusal of certification since 2011's The Bunny Game, Bressack stated:

As a Jewish man, and a victim of anti-Semitic hate, I made a horror film that depicts the very thing that haunts my dreams. As an artist I wanted to tell a story to remind us that we live in a dangerous world; a world where racial violence is on the rise. It saddens me to learn that censorship is still alive and well.

See also
 List of films banned in the United Kingdom

References

External links
 
 

2013 films
2013 horror films
2013 horror thriller films
American horror thriller films
American independent films
American exploitation films
Films about fascists
Films about Jews and Judaism
Films about race and ethnicity
Films about racism
Films about rape
Found footage films
Films about neo-Nazism
Home invasions in film
Obscenity controversies in film
Films originally rejected by the British Board of Film Classification
2010s English-language films
Films directed by James Cullen Bressack
2010s American films